Maria Bernard (born April 6, 1993 in Calgary, Alberta) is a Canadian track and field athlete competing in the middle-distance events, predominantly the 3,000-meter steeplechase.

In July 2016, she was officially named to Canada's Olympic team.

Bernard competed for the UBC Thunderbirds during her time in university, leading her team to three NAIA cross country team championships from 2012 to 2014. In 2014, Bernard won the NAIA cross country individual title as well, capping off a cross country career with four All-American honours.

An eight-time NAIA All-American in track and field, she was named the 2015 Herbert B. Marett Outstanding Performer Award winner at the conclusion of the NAIA Outdoor Track and Field Championships in Gulf Shores, Ala., after winning both the steeplechase (for the second straight time) and the 5,000-meter run at the national meet. Bernard set the NAIA championship steeplechase record in the preliminaries of the event in 2015.

She also claimed the gold in the steeplechase at the NAIA meet in 2014 and anchored UBC to a victory in the women's 4x800 relay at the NAIA championship in 2013.

References

External links
 
 
 
 
 

1993 births
Living people
Athletes from Calgary
Canadian female steeplechase runners
Athletes (track and field) at the 2016 Summer Olympics
Olympic track and field athletes of Canada
World Athletics Championships athletes for Canada
University of British Columbia alumni